The Best Thing Ever is a punk band/performance art group formed by autistic singer/songwriter Noah Britton in the summer of 2003. The label "punk" is adequate to describe the band's influences and ethics, but the sound that they exhibited changed drastically from show to show.

Biography
The Best Thing Ever's original lineup consisted of Noah Britton, Alex Billig, Jennifer Page, and Emilyn Brodsky. Although the band officially consisted of four people, they played in various incarnations. Britton was the only constant member.

Brodsky landed the band big gigs opening for such acts as The Dresden Dolls, The World/Inferno Friendship Society, and The Gossip, but when she was offered a spot opening for the Magnetic Fields at New York University (NYU), she decided to leave The Best Thing Ever to make it on her own.

All four original members of The Best Thing Ever played together for the last time in November 2004 at the home of Franz Nicolay when Franz produced their unreleased 7", "Would You?"/"What I Want." One month after this recording session, The Best Thing Ever went on hiatus.

On May 1, 2006, Britton, Billig, and Page officially revived The Best Thing Ever moniker before embarking on The Bathroom Tour. For twelve straight days, The Best Thing Ever invaded bathrooms across New England to perform their music for unsuspecting audiences.

The Bathroom Tour DVD, which documents the events of the tour, was released by HIG Records, in April 2007.

In the summer of 2007, the band reunited for The Surprise Tour, playing exclusively unbooked shows all over the country with acts including Andrew Bird and Gravy Train!!!!. A film documenting the tour was released on April 1, 2011.

During the last week of June 2008, the band went on what they claimed would be their last tour, The Retirement Tour, a tour of retirement-related venues.  However, in April, 2009, they played a surprise show at a donut shop in Allston, Massachusetts. They now claim that The Retirement Tour never happened, and that they will continue to perform occasionally.

In February 2010, the band went on The Animals Tour, performing exclusively for animals in the New York City area, including surprise shows at a zoo and an aquarium, and a booked show at a dog shelter.

On April 1, 2011, The Best Thing Ever premiered The Surprise Tour DVD at UnionDocs in Brooklyn, NY. They decided to screen this film every April 1 in a different state, with the 2012 screening in Beverly, Massachusetts, the 2013 screening in Philadelphia, Pennsylvania, and the 2014 screening in Seattle, Washington.

In February 2013, the band booked a concert at a homeless shelter in Boston Harbor in Massachusetts, and dubbed this "The Homeless Sheltour." That August, all four original members performed a 10th anniversary reunion concert, opening for Jeffrey Lewis, where they performed one song from each year of their career, in chronological order.

In June 2014, The Best Thing Ever debuted a Kickstarter campaign to perform at Carnegie Hall, promising all backers a chance to sing with them at the show.

Discography
EPs

DVDs

References

External links
 Tiny Mix Tapes interview
 Official Band Website
 HIG Records
 Emilyn Brodsky's Official Website
 "Why I Write" inspired by TBTE
 MLK Day Special: "Got MLK?" MP3
 Day 1 of The Bathroom Tour on YouTube

Punk rock groups from Massachusetts